E. Paul Schneider (born 6 March 1884 in Plauen/Vogtl., Germany) was a successful German painter and
draughtsman. He was the last court painter of the German Emperor, King of Prussia Wilhelm II and Empress Hermine.

References

1884 births
1969 deaths
People from Plauen
20th-century German painters
20th-century German male artists
German male painters
Court painters